Peter Kawalek is Professor at the Manchester Business School, Head of its Business Economics and Strategy Group, and also with experience as Visiting Faculty at Instituto de Empresa in Madrid, Letterkenny Institute of Technology in Letterkenny, Ireland, Trinity College, Dublin, and other institutions. His books consider the role of technology in organizations and society, the latest being focused on long-term studies of Enterprise Systems. Kawalek is known as a board-level advisor on digital issues, working also with government agencies.

References

Bibliography 
 Lorenzo, O., Kawalek, P., González. G and Ramdani., B., (2011) The Long Conversation, IE Business Publishing, Palgrave Macmillan, 9780230297883
 Warboys, B., Kawalek, P., Robertson I, Greenwood R M (1999)  Business Information Systems: a process approach, McGraw-Hill, 0-07709-464-6
 Kawalek, P., Norris M, Busard D (2000)  Systems Modeling for Business Process Improvement, Artech House, 1-58053-050-8

Living people
Academics of the University of Manchester
Year of birth missing (living people)